Ride, Vaquero! is a 1953 American Western film photographed in Ansco Color  (print by Technicolor)  made by Metro-Goldwyn-Mayer (MGM). It was directed by John Farrow and produced by Stephen Ames from a screenplay by Frank Fenton and John Farrow. The music score was by Bronislau Kaper and the cinematography by Robert Surtees.

The film stars Robert Taylor, Ava Gardner, Anthony Quinn, and Howard Keel with Kurt Kasznar, Ted de Corsia and Jack Elam. Movita appears uncredited in a small role.

Plot
Mexican bandit Jose Esqueda resents settlers in the Brownsville, Texas region, and conducts raids against them. He threatens to burn down their homes, and has burned down the ranch house King Cameron has just built for his wife Cordelia.

Rio, raised like a brother to Esqueda, joins forces with him at first. But in time he forms a partnership with Cameron instead, and even saves his life, although Cordelia continues not to trust him.

Complications arise when Cordelia's distrust turns to desire. Cameron must save both his property and his marriage after Esqueda goes on a rampage, robbing Brownsville's bank and killing the sheriff.

Shot several times by Esqueda and close to death, Cameron is once again saved by Rio, who confronts Esqueda in a final gunfight. Cameron forgives Cordelia for her feelings toward Rio.

Cast
 Robert Taylor as Rio
 Ava Gardner as Cordelia
 Howard Keel as Cameron
 Anthony Quinn as Esqueda
 Jack Elam as Barton
 Kurt Kasznar as Father Antonio

Production
Parts of the film were shot in Kanab Canyon and Johnson Canyon in Utah.

Reception
According to MGM records the film earned $1,834,000 in the US and Canada and $1,593,000 elsewhere resulting in a profit of $895,000.

References

External links
 
 
 
 

1953 films
Films directed by John Farrow
1953 Western (genre) films
American Western (genre) films
Films scored by Bronisław Kaper
Films set in Texas
Films shot in Utah
1950s English-language films
1950s American films